The Definitive Groove Collection is a compilation album of recordings by American R&B band Chic, released by Rhino Records/Warner Music in 2006. The Definitive Groove Collection is the first two-disc Chic compilation to be released and contains all the band's hits and best known album tracks from 1977's Chic to 1992's Chic-Ism in (near) chronological order.

Track listing
All tracks written by Bernard Edwards and Nile Rodgers unless otherwise noted.

Disc one:
"Dance, Dance, Dance (Yowsah, Yowsah, Yowsah)" (Edwards, Lehman, Rodgers) - 8:21
"Everybody Dance"  - 6:42
"Strike Up the Band" (Edwards, Lehman, Rodgers) - 4:34
 Tracks 1-3 from 1977 album Chic
"Le Freak"  - 5:31
"Savoir Faire"  - 5:04
"Chic Cheer"  - 4:44
"At Last I Am Free"  - 7:13
"I Want Your Love"  - 6:56
 Tracks 4-8 from 1978 album C'est Chic
"Good Times"  - 8:15
"My Forbidden Lover"  - 4:42
"What About Me"  - 4:13
"My Feet Keep Dancing"  - 6:41
 Tracks 9-12 from 1979 album Risqué
"Chip off the Old Block"  - 5:00
 From 1980 album Real People

Disc two: 
"Rebels Are We" (7" Edit) - 3:21
"Real People"  (7" Edit) - 3:45
 Tracks 1 & 2 from 1980 album Real People
"Will You Cry (When You Hear This Song)"  - 4:09
 From 1979 album Risqué
"26" - 4:06
"You Can't Do It Alone"  - 4:47
 Tracks 4 & 5 from 1980 album Real People
"Stage Fright"  (7" Edit) - 3:39
"Just out of Reach"  - 3:47
"Flash Back"  - 4:29
"Your Love Is Cancelled"  - 4:16
 Tracks 6-9 from 1981 album Take It Off
"Soup for One"  - 5:36
 From 1982 album Soup For One (soundtrack)
"When You Love Someone"  - 5:09
"Hangin'" (7" Edit)  - 3:38
 Tracks 11 & 12 from 1982 album Tongue in Chic
"Give Me the Lovin'" (7" Edit) - 3:32
"Believer"  - 5:07
"You Are Beautiful"  - 4:37
 Tracks 13-15 from 1983 album Believer
"Chic Mystique"  (Edwards, Princesa, Rodgers) - 6:39
"Your Love"  -  5:57
 Tracks 16 & 17 from 1992 album Chic-ism

Certifications

References 

Chic (band) compilation albums
Albums produced by Nile Rodgers
Albums produced by Bernard Edwards
2006 compilation albums
Rhino Records compilation albums